John Robson is a British canoe sailor.

Robson became the 2008 World Champion in the asymmetric kite fleet event by finishing in front of German Tobias Kunz and fellow Brit Peter McLaren.

Career highlights 

 2008
 Port Phillip Bay,  1st, World Championships Canoe Sailing, Asymmetric Kite Fleet

External links 
 International Canoe Worlds at Port Phillip Bay, Victoria

Living people
British male sailors (sport)
British male canoeists
Year of birth missing (living people)